This is a list of mayors of Wolverhampton in the West Midlands of England, historically part of Staffordshire. Wolverhampton has elected a town council, which in turn has elected a Mayor, since 1848.

Mayors of Wolverhampton

19th century

20th century

21st century

References

External links
 The role of Mayor and the historic role of the Mayor's Office, Wolverhampton City Council

 Wolverhampton
Lists of mayors of places in England
Local government in the West Midlands (county)
 Mayors
Mayors of Wolverhampton